Spirit in the Sky is the debut solo album by American singer-songwriter Norman Greenbaum. It contains his popular hit song, the title track "Spirit in the Sky".

It was released on CD by Varèse Sarabande in 2001, with seven bonus tracks. The album was re-released on vinyl by Varèse Sarabande for Record Store Day, on April 19, 2014.

Track listing
All selections written by Norman Greenbaum.

Side 1
"Junior Cadillac" – 3:38
"Spirit in the Sky" – 4:02
"Skyline" – 3:14
"Jubilee" – 3:01
"Alice Bodine" – 3:42
Side 2

CD Bonus tracks

References

 

1969 debut albums
Varèse Sarabande albums
Reprise Records albums
Norman Greenbaum albums
Albums produced by Erik Jacobsen